Glyceria maxima (syn. G. aquatica (L.) Wahlenb.; G. spectabilis Mert. & W.D.J. Koch; Molinia maxima Hartm.; Poa aquatica L.), imfe Nd commonly known as great manna grass, reed mannagrass, reed sweet-grass, and greater sweet-grass is a species of rhizomatous perennial grasses in the mannagrass genus native to Europe and Western Siberia and growing in wet areas such as riverbanks and ponds. It is highly competitive and invasive and is often considered to be a noxious weed outside its native range.

References

External links

USDA PLANTS Profile
Glyceria maxima in Flora of China

maxima
Grasses of Asia
Grasses of Europe